Josephine may refer to:

People
 Josephine (given name), a given name (including a list of people with the name)
 Josephine (singer), a Greek pop singer

Places
Josephine, Texas, United States
Mount Josephine (disambiguation)
 Josephine County, Oregon, a county located in the U.S. state of Oregon

Film and music
 Josephine (2001 film), an English-language Croatian film directed by Rajko Grlić
Joséphine (2013 film), a French film directed by Agnès Obadia
Josephine (album), album by Magnolia Electric Co.

Songs
"Josephine" (Wayne King song), a 1951 song, recorded by many artists including Les Paul and Ray Charles 
"My Girl Josephine", by Fats Domino, also known as "Josephine" and "Hello Josephine", recorded by many artists
Josephine (Too Many Secrets)", a song by Jon English, 1982
"Josephine" (Chris Rea song), a 1985 song
"Josephine" (Terrorvision song), a 1998 song
"Yes Tonight Josephine", a 1957 song by Johnnie Ray
"Josephine", a 1955 song from the musical Silk Stockings, recorded by Gretchen Wyler, and covered by Pearl Bailey in 1959
"Josephine", a 1965 song by Shawn Elliott
"Josephine", a 1966 song by Dino, Desi & Billy
"Josephine", a 1976 song by String Driven Thing
"Josephine", a 1991 song by The Magnetic Fields from the album Distant Plastic Trees
"Josephine", a 1996 song by The Wallflowers from the album Bringing Down the Horse
"Josephine", a 1999 song by Tori Amos from the album To Venus and Back
"Josephine", a 2019 song by Mcfly from the album The Lost Songs

Other uses
Operation Josephine B, a 1941 attack on an electricity substation in German-occupied France
Hurricane Josephine, several hurricanes
Josephine Mutzenbacher, an erotic novel from 1906

See also

"Goodnight Sweet Josephine", a song by The Yardbirds
"Yes Tonight Josephine", a single by Johnnie Ray
 Josephines
 Josefina (disambiguation)
 Josephina (disambiguation)